Radial means that the fluid is flowing in radial direction that is either from inward to outward or from outward to inward. If the fluid is flowing from inward to outward then it is called outflow radial turbine.

 In such turbines, the water enters at the centre of the wheel and then flows outwards (i.e., towards the outer periphery of the wheel).
 Here guide mechanism is surrounded by the runner.
 In this turbine, the inner diameter of the runner is the inlet and outer diameter is an outlet.

In radial outflow turbine the fluid expands in the turbine that is the fluid enlarges in the rotor. It follows the organic rankine cycle. Here the flow is radially outwards and it gets discharged at the periphery of the runner. But here the speed is difficult to control.

Components of Out-flow Turbine 
The Main Components of Reaction Turbine are :

 Spiral Casing: On this spiral casing the entire system or entire assembly is attached.
 Guide Vanes: Converts the pressure energy into momentum energy. These are inside the spiral casing. Here the first drop of pressure occurs and thus equivalent amount of kinetic energy rises which is then imparted to the runner. And then the runner starts to rotate.
 Runner: On here the radial flow acts on runner vanes causing the runner to spin. The runner is connected to the shaft which rotates along with it and thus this can be used for power production.
 Draft Tube: It is connected to outlet of the turbine which helps in water exiting the spiral casing. It is used because the exit pressure becomes less than the atmospheric pressure in the turbine and thus it becomes difficult for the fluid to get out from the spiral casing. To make it exit from the tail race we make a tube of diverging cross section so that the pressure can increased because of the increase in the cross section the velocity decreases and thus pressure increases thus the fluid can exit the turbine.

Comparison between inward and outward radial flow reaction turbine

Advantages 
Some of the advantages of radial outflow turbine are:

 The configuration of radial flow turbine is very simple, it, actually looks very similar to a centrifugal compressor.
 Radial flow turbines are very robust machines and they are easy to configure. As a result of that they were indeed considered for the application before axial turbine.
 Just like centrifugal compressors; radial flow turbines have very high energy extraction capability in one single stage.

So the radial flow turbines are indeed the more preferred form of energy extraction than even compared to axial flow turbines, especially in small engines. Radial flow turbine rotor does not use aerofoil sections, as a result of which the rotor of radial flow turbine has a shape very similar to a centrifugal compressor and it uses 3D shape for energy extraction. This 3D shape has been become a great interest in modern research.

References 

 Al Jubori, A. M., Al-Dadah, R. K., Mahmoud, S., & Daabo, A. (2017). Modelling and parametric analysis of small-scale axial and radial-outflow turbines for Organic Rankine Cycle applications. Applied energy, 190, 981-996.
 Erwin, J. R. (1969). U.S. Patent No. 3,465,518. Washington, DC: U.S. Patent and Trademark Office.
 Turnquist, N. A., Willey, L. D., & Wolfe, C. E. (2002). U.S. Patent No. 6,439,844. Washington, DC: U.S. Patent and Trademark Office.
 Pini, M., Persico, G., Casati, E., & Dossena, V. (2013). Preliminary design of a centrifugal turbine for organic rankine cycle applications. Journal of Engineering for Gas turbines and power, 135(4), 042312.
 Childs, D. (1993). Turbomachinery rotordynamics: phenomena, modeling, and analysis. John Wiley & Sons.
 Hiett, G. F., & Johnston, I. H. (1963, June). Paper 7: Experiments concerning the aerodynamic performance of inward flow radial turbines. In Proceedings of the Institution of Mechanical Engineers, Conference Proceedings (Vol. 178, No. 9, pp. 28-42). Sage UK: London, England: SAGE Publications.
 Rodgers, C., & Geiser, R. (1987). Performance of a high-efficiency radial/axial turbine.

Turbines